Paneer makhani (also called paneer butter masala) is a slightly sweet Indian dish of paneer, originating in New Delhi, in which the gravy is prepared usually with butter (makhan), tomatoes and cashews. Spices such as red chili powder and garam masala are also used to prepare this gravy.

A survey found that paneer butter masala was one of the top five foods ordered in India.

Etymology 
Makhan is the Hindi word for 'butter'. Makhani means 'buttery'. This dish originated in the 1950s at Moti Mahal restaurant in Delhi. Kundan Lal Jaggi invented the dish by mixing fresh butter into a tomato-based curry.

Recipe 
There is no strict set of steps to make this gravy. Below is one of the ways in which makhani gravy is prepared.

 Frying cashew nuts and tomatoes and grinding both of them into a fine paste.
 Adding spices like cardamom and bay leaf.
 Usage of sour curd into the gravy (though in some preparation methods only tomatoes are used).
 Generous usage of butter.
 Usage of garam masala, red chili powder, kasuri methi and coriander leaves.

See also 

 Indian cuisine
 North Indian cuisine
 Punjabi cuisine
 List of Indian dishes
 Tandoori chicken
 Dal makhani
 Butter chicken
 Chicken tikka masala

References 

Indian cuisine
North Indian cuisine
Punjabi cuisine
Indian cheese dishes